The Tiber is the third-longest river in Italy and the longest in Central Italy, rising in the Apennine Mountains in Emilia-Romagna and flowing  through Tuscany, Umbria, and Lazio, where it is joined by the River Aniene, to the Tyrrhenian Sea, between Ostia and Fiumicino. The river has achieved lasting fame as the main watercourse of the city of Rome, which was founded on its eastern banks.

The river rises at Mount Fumaiolo in central Italy and flows in a generally southerly direction past Perugia and Rome to meet the sea at Ostia. However, it does not form a proportional delta, owing to a strong north-flowing sea current close to the shore, to the steep shelving of the coast, and to slow tectonic subsidence.

Sources

These springs are called le Vene. During the 1930s, Benito Mussolini had an antique marble Roman column built at the point where the river rises, inscribed QUI NASCE IL FIUME SACRO AI DESTINI DI ROMA ("Here is born the river / sacred to the destinies of Rome"). An eagle is on the top of the column, part of its fascist symbolism. The first miles of the Tiber run through Valtiberina before entering Umbria.

Etymology
The genesis of the name Tiber probably was pre-Latin, like the Roman name of Tibur (modern Tivoli), and may be specifically Italic in origin. The same root is found in the Latin praenomen Tiberius. Also, Etruscan variants of this praenomen are in Thefarie (borrowed from Faliscan *Tiferios, lit. '(He) from the Tiber' < *Tiferis 'Tiber') and Teperie (via the Latin hydronym Tiber).

Legendary king Tiberinus, ninth in the king-list of Alba Longa, was said to have drowned in the River Albula, which was afterward called Tiberis. The myth may have explained a memory of an earlier, perhaps pre-Indo-European name for the river, "white" (alba) with sediment, or "from the mountains" from pre-Indo-European word "alba, albion" mount, elevated area. Tiberis/Tifernus may be a pre-Indo-European substrate word related to Aegean tifos "still water", Greek phytonym τύφη a kind of swamp and river bank weed (Typha angustifolia), Iberian hydronyms Tibilis, Tebro and Numidian Aquae Tibilitanae. Yet another etymology is from *dubri-, water, considered by Alessio as Sicel, whence the form Θύβρις later Tiberis. This root *dubri- is widespread in Western Europe e.g. Dover, Portus Dubris.

History
Tiber Island, in the center of the river between Trastevere and the ancient city center, was the site of an important ancient ford and was later bridged. Legend says Rome's founders, the twin brothers Romulus and Remus, were abandoned on its waters, where they were rescued by the she-wolf, Lupa.

The river marked the boundary between the lands of the Etruscans to the west, the Sabines to the east and the Latins to the south. Benito Mussolini, born in Romagna, adjusted the boundary between Tuscany and Emilia-Romagna, so that the springs of the Tiber would lie in Romagna.

The Tiber was critically important to Roman trade and commerce, as ships could reach as far as  upriver; some evidence indicates that it was used to ship grain from the Val Teverina as long ago as the fifth century BC. It was later used to ship stone, timber, and foodstuffs to Rome.

During the Punic Wars of the third century BC, the harbour at Ostia became a key naval base. It later became Rome's most important port, where wheat, olive oil, and wine were imported from Rome's colonies around the Mediterranean. Wharves were also built along the riverside in Rome itself, lining the riverbanks around the Campus Martius area. The Romans connected the river with a sewer system (the Cloaca Maxima) and with an underground network of tunnels and other channels, to bring its water into the middle of the city.

Wealthy Romans had garden-parks or horti on the banks of the river in Rome through the first century BC. These may have been sold and developed about a century later.

The heavy sedimentation of the river made maintaining Ostia difficult, prompting the emperors Claudius and Trajan to establish a new port on the Fiumicino in the first century AD. They built a new road, the Via Portuensis, to connect Rome with Fiumicino, leaving the city by Porta Portese (the port gate). Both ports were eventually abandoned due to silting.

Several popes attempted to improve navigation on the Tiber in the 17th and 18th centuries, with extensive dredging continuing into the 19th century. Trade was boosted for a while, but by the 20th century, silting had resulted in the river only being navigable as far as Rome.

There were also numerous major floods; for example, on September 15, 1557 the river flooded to a height of 62 feet above sea level and over 1,000 people died. The river is now confined between high stone embankments, which were begun in 1876. Within the city, the riverbanks are lined by boulevards known as lungoteveri, streets "along the Tiber".

Because the river is identified with Rome, the terms "swimming the Tiber" or "crossing the Tiber" have come to be the shorthand term for converting to Roman Catholicism. A Catholic who converts to Protestantism, in particular Anglicanism, is referred to as "swimming the Thames" or "crossing the Thames".

In ancient Rome, executed criminals were thrown into the Tiber. People executed at the Gemonian stairs were thrown in the Tiber during the later part of the reign of the emperor Tiberius. This practice continued over the centuries. For example, the corpse of Pope Formosus was thrown into the Tiber after the infamous Cadaver Synod held in 897.

Bridges

In addition to the numerous modern bridges over the Tiber in Rome, there remain a few ancient bridges (now mostly pedestrian-only) that have survived in part (e.g., the Ponte Milvio and the Ponte Sant'Angelo), or in whole (Pons Fabricius).

In addition to bridges, the Metro trains use tunnels.

Representations

Following the standard Roman depiction of rivers as powerfully built reclining male gods, the Tiber, also interpreted as a god named Tiberinus, is shown with streams of water flowing from his hair and beard.

2022 Heatwave

In 2022, there was a major heatwave in Europe. The water levels dropped and a number of objects emerged. Some of these objects include World War 2 shipwrecks, bombs and a 2000 year old bridge.

See also
 Hollywood on the Tiber

References

External links

 
Rivers of Italy
Rivers of the Apennines
Drainage basins of the Tyrrhenian Sea
Waterways of Italy
Rivers of Emilia-Romagna
Rivers of Lazio
Rivers of Tuscany
Rivers of Umbria
Geography of Rome
Metropolitan City of Rome Capital
Topography of the ancient city of Rome
Rivers of the Province of Perugia
Rivers of the Province of Rieti
Rivers of the Province of Terni
Rivers of the Province of Viterbo
Rivers of the Province of Arezzo
Rivers of the Province of Forlì-Cesena
Rivers of the Province of Rome
Geography of Perugia